The War of the Oxen (German: Der Ochsenkrieg) is a 1914 historical novel by the German writer Ludwig Ganghofer. It is a drama set against the backdrop of the War of the Oxen in the 1420s.

The novel has been adapted on three occasions: 
 The War of the Oxen (1920 film), a silent film adaptation
 The War of the Oxen (1943 film), a film adaptation
 The War of the Oxen (TV series), a 1987 television adaptation

References

Bibliography
 Goble, Alan. The Complete Index to Literary Sources in Film. Walter de Gruyter, 1999.
 Nemoianu, Virgil.  Postmodernism and Cultural Identities: Conflicts and Coexistence. CUA Press, 2010.

Novels set in the 15th century
1914 German-language novels
1914 German novels
German historical novels
Novels by Ludwig Ganghofer
German novels adapted into films